Jülich (in old spellings also known as Guelich or Gülich, Ripuarian: Jöllesch) is a town in the district of Düren, in the federal state of North Rhine-Westphalia, Germany.  As a border region between the competing powers in the Lower Rhine and Meuse areas, the town and the Duchy of Jülich played a historic role from the Middle Ages up to the 17th century.

Geography 
Jülich stands in the Rur valley on the banks of the river Rur. The town is bordered by the town of Linnich in the north, the municipality of Titz in the northeast, the municipality of Niederzier in the southeast, the municipality of Inden in the south, and by the municipality of Aldenhoven in the west. Its maximum size is 13.3 km from east to west and 10.9 km from north to south.

The highest point in Jülich is in Bourheim, 110 m above sea level (excepting Sophienhöhe, an extensive artificial mountain made up of overburden from a nearby open-pit lignite mine, the Tagebau Hambach).

Climate

Köppen-Geiger climate classification system classifies its climate as oceanic (Cfb).

Boroughs 
The town of Jülich comprises 16 boroughs:

 Town centre
 Altenburg
 
 Bourheim
 Broich
 Daubenrath
 Güsten
 Kirchberg
 Koslar
 Lich-Steinstraß
 Mersch
 Merzenhausen
 Pattern
 Selgersdorf
 Stetternich
 Welldorf (including Serrest)

History 

Jülich is first mentioned in Roman times as Juliacum along an important road through the Rur valley. Fortified during the late Roman period, it was taken over by the Franks and grew to be the centre of a county which became the nucleus of a regional power. The counts and dukes of Jülich extended their influence during the Middle Ages and granted Jülich city status in 1234 (Count Wilhelm IV). During battles with the Archbishop of Cologne, Jülich was destroyed in 1239 and again in 1278.

In 1416, the city was granted fiscal independence by Duke Rainald of Jülich-Geldern. Following a fire in 1547, the city was rebuilt as an ideal city in the Renaissance style under the direction of the architect Alessandro Pasqualini. The citadel of Jülich was later visited by the French military engineer Sébastien le Prestre de Vauban and was rated exemplary.

After the ducal family line was extinguished in 1609, the Duchy of Jülich was divided in the War of the Jülich Succession; as part of that war, the fortress at Jülich was occupied by Emperor Rudolph's forces.  The 1610 siege by Dutch, Brandenburg and Palatine forces led to the surrender and withdrawal of Imperial troops.  

Jülich was occupied by the Dutch Republic until 1621-22 when the Spanish took the fortress after a five months of siege. Control of the city later fell to Palatinate-Neuburg, then the Electorate of the Palatinate (1685) and Bavaria (1777).

From 1794 to 1814, Jülich was part of France under the name of Juliers. The French added the Napoleonic bridge head to the fortifications. In 1815, Jülich became a Prussian fortification and district town. The town was subsequently administered within the Prussian Province of Jülich-Cleves-Berg (1815) and then the Rhine Province (1822). The fortification was razed in 1860.

On 16 November 1944 (World War II), 97% of Jülich was destroyed during Allied bombing, since it was considered one of the main obstacles to the occupation of the Rhineland, although the city fortifications, the bridge head and the citadel had long fallen into disuse. The ruined city was subject to heavy fighting for several months until the Allies eventually managed to cross the Ruhr on 23 February 1945. Newsreel footage exists of Supreme Commander Eisenhower at the southern entrance to the citadel.

Jülich became part of the new state of North Rhine-Westphalia after the war. From 1949 to 1956, the town centre was rebuilt along the plans of the Renaissance town.

In 1998, the state garden fair took place in Jülich. This made the extensive restoration of the bridge head fortifications and the establishment of a large leisure park, the bridge head park, possible.

Today, Jülich is mainly known for Forschungszentrum Jülich (established in 1956) and the satellite campus of the Fachhochschule Aachen (established in 1970). The town's landmark is the Witch Tower, a city gate and remnant of the medieval city fortifications. The most impressive remnants from the past are, however, both the Napoleonic Bridgehead and the Citadel.

Gallery

Population history

Twin towns – sister cities

Jülich is twinned with:
 Haubourdin, France (1964)
 Taicang, China (2017)

Transport

BAB 4 (Düren / Jülich Interchange)
BAB 44
(Jülich Ost (East)/ Mersch Interchange)
(Jülich West (West)/ Koslar Interchange)
Rurtalbahn, literally the Rur Valley Railway (Linnich - Jülich - Düren - Heimbach)

Culture and landmarks

Museums 

 Historical Town Museum

Buildings 

Particularly notable:
 the Witchtower (Hexenturm)
 the Citadel
 the Napoleonic Bridgehead
 the Church of the Assumption
 the Aachener Tor (lit. Aachen Gate)
 aerial towers of shortwave broadcasting facility

Shortwave broadcasting facility 
In 1956 the WDR broadcaster established the first short wave transmitter near the borough Mersch. In the subsequent years this site was expanded. On September 1, 1961, this site was handed over to the German Federal Post for establishing the German foreign broadcasting service, "Deutsche Welle". In the course of time 10 transmitters of 100 kilowatts were installed, whereby as transmitting antennas enormous dipole arrays between free standing steel framework towers were installed. Later these transmitters were rented to the predominant part to non-German broadcasting organisations. In the 90's on the area of the shortwave transmission facility also a transmitting plant for medium wave was installed, using a long wire antenna which is spun at a tower on the transmitter site. It was intended to be used for transmission of the programme of radio Viva on 702 kHz, but it never went into regular service for this broadcaster. From December 6, 2004, to May 2006, the medium-wave transmitter was used to broadcast the programme of the German commercial broadcaster "TruckRadio" on 702 kHz. In 2006 the shortwave-facilities were sold to the British entrepreneur Robert Edmiston and his Christian Vision-organization. However, on October 24, 2009, the site was shut down and antennas and transmitters have been dismantled by now.

Miscellaneous 
The reliquaries of Christina von Stommeln.

Sport 

Jülich-based sports teams are TTC Jülich (table tennis, which competes in the Bundesliga, the domestic premiere league) and the SC Jülich 1910, an amateur football (soccer) club that won the German national amateur championships in 1969, 1970 and 1971.

Healthcare 

St. Elisabeth Hospital

On November 19, 1891, the St. Elisabeth Hospital Jülich was opened. It was completely destroyed in World War II, but was rebuilt in 1946 and expanded over the following years: in 1950, an eye and an ENT department were set up, and in 1959 the specialist department for gynecology and obstetrics. There has been a nursing school since 1964. In 2003 an outpatient surgery center and in 2006 a new ward block were built. It is a 156-bed hospital with 300 employees.

The sponsors were from 1891 to 1963 the city of Jülich, from 1963 to 1987 the Caritas association for the diocese of Aachen, from 1987 to 2010 the Malteser St. Elisabeth gGmbH and since 2010 it has been the Caritas Trägergesellschaft West gGmbH

Rescue service
The German Red Cross and the Malteser Hilfsdienst operate the rescue service in Jülich. The district of Düren (RDKD) has commissioned them to carry out the rescue service. The rescue stations are located in Jülich (DRK) and in the district of Mersch (MHD). The emergency vehicle is at the Jülich hospital.

Notable people 
 Alessandro Pasqualini
 Bobby Julich, American Cycling Star has traced his family ancestry back to Jülich
 In the Netherlands, the name Van Gulik is quite common, e.g. the much translated author Robert van Gulik. But one also finds variants like: Van Gulick, Van de(r) Gulik (cf David Van Der Gulik), Guliks, Gulickx, Gulikers, and Jülicher
 Nikolaus von Maillot de la Treille, the Bavarian war minister, was born in Jülich

Citizens 
 Johann Wilhelm Schirmer (1807–1863), landscape artist
 Antonius Fischer (1840–1912), archbishop and cardinal
 Dürbeck & Dohmen, composer duo, René Dohmen (born 1966) and Joachim Dürbeck (born 1967)
  (born 1967), mayor of Jülich
 Robert Leipertz (born 1993), football player
 Heinz-Günther Nesselrath (born 1957), philologist 
 Goswin Nickel (1582–1664), 10th Superior-General of the Jesuits
 Gregory P. Unholt (born 1937), Jülich-born, German-American computer scientist

Associated with the town
 Grünberg, Peter (born 1939), physicist, Nobel Prize 2007

Literature 

 Guido von Büren (Hrsg.): Jülich Stadt - Territorium - Geschichte]', Kleve 2000, 
 Ulrich Coenen: Von Juliacum bis Jülich. Die Baugeschichte der Stadt und ihrer Vororte von der Antike bis zu Gegenwart, 2. Aufl., Aachen 1989. 
 Ulrich Coenen: Stadt Jülich = Rheinische Kunststätten, Heft 368, Neuss 1991. 
 Conrad Doose/Siegfried Peters: Renaissancefestung Jülich, 1998, 
 Ulrich Eckardt/Wolfgang Hommel/Werner Katscher: Flug über Jülich, 2003, 
 Wolfgang Hommel: Stadtführer Jülich, 1998, 
 Wolfgang Hommel: Jülich im Aufbruch - Landesgartenschau und Stadtentwicklungsprogramm Jülich '98, 1998, 
 Dr. Erwin Fuchs/Wolfgang Hommel: Die Jülicher und ihre Wurzeln, 1997, 
 Eva Behrens-Hommel: Sagen und Überlieferungen des Jülicher Landes, 1996, 
 Eva Behrens-Hommel:  Mundartsammlung des Jülicher Landes, 1997, 
 Hartwig Neumann: Stadt und Festung Jülich auf bildlichen Darstellungen, Bonn 1991. 
 Gabriele Spelthahn: An der Synagoge - Jülich und der Holocaust'', 1997,

References

External links

 
 The research centre
 Campus Jülich of FH-Aachen (University of Applied Sciences)
 The culture and leisure centre
 The former state garden fair
 Nice Webcam with a view of the witch tower
 Edicts of Jülich, Cleves, Berg, Grand Duchy Berg, 1475-1815 (Coll. Scotti) online
 Settlement of Dortmund between Brandenburg and Palatinate-Neuburg and the conflict of succession in Jülich, in full text

Düren (district)
Districts of the Rhine Province